Gorgyra aretina, the blotched leaf sitter, is a butterfly in the family Hesperiidae. It is found in Guinea, Sierra Leone, Liberia, Ivory Coast, Ghana, Togo, Nigeria, Cameroon, Gabon, the Central African Republic, the Democratic Republic of the Congo, Sudan, Uganda, western Kenya, western Tanzania and north-western Zambia. The habitat consists of forests.

Adults of both sexes are attracted to flowers and males mud-puddle.

References

Butterflies described in 1878
Erionotini
Butterflies of Africa
Taxa named by William Chapman Hewitson